Arabs in Greece, known as Araves, are the people from Arab world countries, particularly Lebanon, Syria, the Palestinian Territories, Iraq, Jordan, many of whom are Christian, and also small groups from Egypt, Algeria, Tunisia, Morocco, Libya and Sudan, who emigrated from their native nations and currently reside in Greece and are mainly Muslim in religion. Although some these people belong to different religions and ethnic descent near Arab ethnic, such as Coptic Christians, Berbers, Syriacs and Kurds, they are usually referred to as Arabs. The majority tend to live in Athens and Thessaloniki. However, they can be found in all parts of the country. In addition, Greece has people from Arab world countries, who have the status of refugees (e.g. refugees of the Syrian civil war) or illegal immigrants trying to immigrate to Western Europe.

References

External links

 
Arabs
Middle Eastern diaspora in Greece